Norgesterone, also known as norvinodrel or vinylestrenolone and sold under the brand name Vestalin, is a progestin medication which was formerly used in birth control pills for women but is now no longer marketed. It was used in combination with the estrogen ethinylestradiol. It is taken by mouth.

Norgesterone is a progestin, or a synthetic progestogen, and hence is an agonist of the progesterone receptor, the biological target of progestogens like progesterone. It has no androgenic activity.

Norgesterone was first described in 1962. It is no longer available.

Medical uses
Norgesterone was used in combination with ethinylestradiol in birth control pills to prevent pregnancy. It is no longer available.

Pharmacology

Pharmacodynamics
Norgesterone is a progestogen, and hence is an agonist of the progesterone receptor. Unlike related progestins, it is virtually devoid of androgenic activity in animal assays.

Chemistry

Norgesterone, also known as 17α-vinyl-δ5(10)-19-nortestosterone or as 17α-vinylestr-5(10)-en-17β-ol-3-one, is a synthetic estrane steroid and a derivative of testosterone and 19-nortestosterone. Analogues of norgesterone include norvinisterone (17α-vinyl-19-nortestosterone) and vinyltestosterone (17α-vinyltestosterone).

History
Norgesterone was first described in 1962.

Society and culture

Generic names
Norgesterone is the generic name of the drug and its . It has also been referred to as norvinodrel, vinylestrenolone, and vinylnoretynodrel.

Brand names
Norgesterone was marketed in combination with ethinylestradiol, an estrogen, as a birth control pill under the brand name Vestalin.

Availability
Norgesterone is no longer marketed and hence is no longer available in any country.

References

Abandoned drugs
Alkene derivatives
Estranes
Hormonal contraception
Ketones
Progestogens
Vinyl compounds